Limeroad is an Indian online marketplace, owned by A. M. Marketplaces Pvt Ltd. The company is based in Gurugram, Haryana.

It is India's first women's social shopping website. It deals in clothing and accessories for women, men and kids. The portal allows its users to create their own look on a virtual scrapbook by using its products and  also allows users to earn from the scrapbook they create.

Background 
Limeroad was founded in 2012 by Suchi Mohan, Manish Saksena and Ankush Mehra as a fashion marketplace for women. The company's name is inspired from Grand Trunk Road.

The company raised US$5 million Series A round of funding from Matrix Partners and Lightspeed Venture Partners in 2012 followed by Series B round US$15 million in 2014 and Series C round US$30 million from Tiger Global, Lightspeed Venture Partners and Matrix Partners in 2015.

In 2016, Limeroad came into partnership with the Madhya Pradesh Government's M.P. Laghu Udyog Nigam (MPLUN) to promote handloom and handicraft products online in India.
 
Limeroad competes with e-commerce companies such as Amazon, Flipkart and Snapdeal, Myntra, Jabong, Roposo, Wooplr and Voonik.

Awards

See also 
 Social shopping
 E-commerce in India
 Online shopping

References

External links
 

Indian companies established in 2012
Companies based in Haryana
Indian brands
Online clothing retailers of India
Privately held companies of India
2012 establishments in Haryana